is a private university in Asao-ku, Kawasaki Kanagawa Prefecture, Japan.

History
The predecessor of the school was founded in Shinjuku-ku, Tokyo, in 1930. It relocated to Atsugi, Kanagawa, and was chartered as a junior college in 1969. In 1984 it became a four-year college and adopted the present name. It moved to its present location in Kawasaki in 1989.

External links
 Official website  

Private universities and colleges in Japan
Universities and colleges in Kanagawa Prefecture
Kawasaki, Kanagawa
Educational institutions established in 1930
Music schools in Japan
1930 establishments in Japan
Western Metropolitan Area University Association